Ramzan Ismailovich Asayev (born 27 February 1993) is a former Russian football goalkeeper.

Career
Asayev made his professional debut for FC Terek Grozny on 13 July 2010 in the Russian Cup game against FC Luch-Energiya Vladivostok.

External links
 
 
  Player page on the official FC Terek Grozny website
 

1993 births
Living people
Russian Muslims
Russian footballers
Association football goalkeepers
FC Akhmat Grozny players
Russian people of Chechen descent
Chechen people